Eucalyptus gregsoniana, commonly known as the Wolgan snow gum or mallee snow gum, is a species of mallee that is endemic to New South Wales. It has white to pale grey bark, lance-shaped to curved adult leaves, flower buds in groups of between seven and eleven, white flowers and cup-shaped, hemispherical or conical fruit.

Description
It has smooth light grey to white bark with patches of other colours. Flowering occurs between November and December and the flowers are white.

Taxonomy and naming
Eucalyptus gregsoniana was first formally described in 1973 by Lawrie Johnson and Donald Blaxell in Contributions from the New South Wales Herbarium. The specific epithet gregsoniana honours Jesse Gregson and his son, Edward Gregson for their observations of eucalypts, especially in the Blue Mountains.

Distribution and habitat
Wolgan snow gum grows in mallee and heath vegetation on the mountains and tablelands of the Blue Mountains and Budawang Mountains as well as on the Southern Tablelands between Newnes and Wadbilliga.

References

gregsoniana
Myrtales of Australia
Flora of New South Wales
Plants described in 1973
Taxa named by Lawrence Alexander Sidney Johnson